Plagiochasma is a liverwort genus in the family Aytoniaceae.

Species list 
 Plagiochasma appendiculatum, Aitonia appendiculata
 Plagiochasma articulatum
 Plagiochasma beccarianum, Aytonia beccariana
 Plagiochasma bicornutum
 Plagiochasma cordatum, Aitonia fissisquama
 Plagiochasma crenulatum
 Plagiochasma cuneatum
 Plagiochasma denticulatum
 Plagiochasma eximium, Aitonia eximia
 Plagiochasma intermedium - China
 Plagiochasma japonicum
 Plagiochasma landii
 Plagiochasma martensii
 Plagiochasma megacarpon
 Plagiochasma microcephalum, Aitonia microcephala
 Plagiochasma muenchianum
 Plagiochasma nepalense, Antrocephalus nepalensis
 Plagiochasma pauriana
 Plagiochasma pterospermum
 Plagiochasma purandharensis
 Plagiochasma quadricornutum
 Plagiochasma rupestre, Aitonia australis
 Plagiochasma simlensis
 Plagiochasma wrightii

References

External links 

Aytoniaceae
Marchantiales genera